Lalit Kumar is a member of the Rajasthan Legislative Assembly from Kishanganj, Rajasthan, India.

Early life
Kumar was born in the village of Jeerod near Atru on 1 July 1987.

Education
Kumar has an MA from Government University (2008) and a B.Ed. from Adarsh College (2011).

References

1987 births
Members of the Rajasthan Legislative Assembly
People from Ajmer district
Living people
Bharatiya Janata Party politicians from Rajasthan